Events from the year 1911 in France.

Incumbents
President: Armand Fallières 
President of the Council of Ministers: 
 until 2 March: Aristide Briand
 2 March-27 June: Ernest Monis
 starting 27 June: Joseph Caillaux

Events
1 July – Agadir Crisis
22 August – Theft of Mona Lisa discovered in Louvre. (Vincenzo Peruggia is captured and the painting returned 1913).
25 September – French battleship Liberté explodes at anchor in Toulon.
21 December – First robbery of the Bonnot gang.
Champagne Riots.

Births

January to June
5 January – Jean-Pierre Aumont, actor (died 2001)
15 January – Jean Talairach, neurosurgeon (died 2007)
16 January – Roger Lapébie, cyclist, won the 1937 Tour de France (died 1996)
17 January – André-Georges Haudricourt, anthropologist and linguist (died 1996)
18 January – Charles Delaunay, author, jazz expert, co-founder and long-term leader of the Hot club de France (died 1988)
22 January – André Roussin, playwright (died 1987)
24 January – René Barjavel, author, journalist and critic (died 1985)
30 January – René Duverger, weightlifter and Olympic gold medallist (died 1983)
2 February – Jean-Jacques Grunenwald, organist, composer and architect (died 1982)
14 February – Jean-Louis Nicot, Air Force officer involved in the Algiers putsch (died 2004)
23 February – Pierre Meile, French linguist (died 1963)
7 April – Hervé Bazin, writer (died 1996)
9 April – Paul Coste-Floret, politician (died 1979)
10 April – Maurice Schumann, politician (died 1998)
2 May – Edmond Pagès, cyclist (died 1987)
17 May – André Jaunet, flautist (died 1988)
24 May – Michel Pécheux, fencer (died 1985)
6 June – Jean Cayrol, poet and publisher (died 2005)
15 June – Joseph Alcazar, international soccer player (died 1979)

July to September
5 July – Georges Pompidou, President of France (died 1974)
23 July – Jean Fontenay, cyclist (died 1975)
1 August – André Guinier, physicist (died 2000)
18 August – Jacques Wertheimer, businessman (died 1996)
25 August – André Leroi-Gourhan, archaeologist, paleontologist, paleoanthropologist and anthropologist (died 1986)
7 September – Henri de France, pioneering television inventor (died 1986)

October to December
12 October – Louis de Guiringaud, politician and Minister (died 1982)
13 October – André Navarra, cellist and cello teacher (died 1988)
19 October – Laurette Séjourné, archeologist and ethnologist (died 2003)
31 October – René Hardy, French Resistance worker (died 1987)
1 November – Henri Troyat, author, biographer, historian and novelist (died 2007)
7 November – Yolande Beekman, World War II heroine (executed) (died 1944)
22 November – Georges Bégué, engineer and Special Operations Executive agent (died 1993)
26 November – Robert Marchand, cyclist (died 2021)
8 December – Sauveur Ducazeaux, cyclist (died 1987)
21 December – Yves Godard, military officer (died 1975)
25 December – Louise Bourgeois, artist and sculptor (died 2010)
28 December – Gustave Malécot, mathematician (died 1998)
29 December – Bernard Saint-Hillier, General (died 2004)

Full date unknown
Louis Dumont, anthropologist (died 1998)
Louis Henry, historian (died 1991)

Deaths
13 February – Alphonse Pinart, explorer, philologist, and ethnographer (born 1852)
17 February – Auguste Houzeau, agronomist and chemist (born 1829)
24 March – Rodolphe-Madeleine Cleophas Dareste de la Chavanne, jurist (born 1824)
29 March – Alexandre Guilmant, organist and composer (born 1837)
7 June – Maurice Rouvier, statesman (born 1842)
18 July – Jules Bourgeois, entomologist (born 1847)
11 September – Louis Henri Boussenard, author of adventure novels (born 1847)
30 September – Louis Joseph Troost, chemist (born 1825)
7 October – Marie Clément Gaston Gautier, botanist (born 1841)
8 December – Alphonse Legros, painter and etcher (born 1837)

References

Links

1910s in France